A Jagdschloss is a hunting lodge in German-speaking countries. It is a schloss set in a wildlife park or a hunting area (such as a forest, field or by a lake) that served primarily as accommodation for a ruler or aristocrat and his entourage while hunting in the area.

Characteristics

A Jagdschloss was often the venue for a banquet accompanying a hunt, and sometimes it also hosted festivals and other events. The term Jagdschloss is often equated to the Lustschloss or maison de plaisance, particularly as the hunt was also a recreational activity. However, a Lustschloss and Jagdschloss differ in function as well as architecture. The layout and furnishing of a Lustschloss is unconstrained, while that of a Jagdschloss is always related to hunting: the walls may be adorned with antlers and other trophies, with scenes of hunting, and also by a deliberate use of wood or other natural materials.

A Jagdschloss could also be very lavishly furnished, but unlike a Lustschloss, timber-framed buildings or log cabins were not uncommon. Only a few imposing stone buildings have survived, which colours the general understanding of what a Jagdschloss is today. A Jagdschloss often had stables and other outbuildings used to house hunting equipment, coaches and the entourage. Larger examples often form self-contained ensembles, while smaller ones, known as Jagdhäuser, were often built within castle parks and gardens, within range of the Residenz of the owner.

Surviving Jagdschlösser

 Amalienburg in the park of Nymphenburg Palace, Bavaria
 Augustusburg Hunting Lodge in Augustusburg, Saxony
 Baldone Manor in Zemgale, Latvia.
 Clemenswerth in Sögel, Lower Saxony
 Engers Palace 
 Falkenlust in Brühl, North Rhine-Westphalia
 Gelbensande Hunting Lodge
 Glienicke Hunting Lodge
 Granitz Hunting Lodge
 Grünau Hunting Lodge by Neuburg on the Danube
 Grunewald Hunting Lodge in Berlin
 Hubertusstock Hunting Lodge in the Schorfheide
 Jagdschloss Kranichstein in Darmstadt
 Letzlingen Hunting Lodge 
 Marshal's Cabin in Loppi, Finland
 Moritzburg Castle in Saxony 
 Quitzin Hunting Lodge in Western Pomerania
 Rominten Hunting Lodge
 Springe Hunting Lodge 
 Stern Hunting Lodge in Potsdam
 Wolfsgarten Castle in Hesse
 Wolfstein Hunting Lodge in Kochholz
 Schloss Fuschl in Austria
 Schloss Holzheim in Hesse

See also
 Lustschloss

Literature
 Monique Chatenet (ed.): Maisons des champs dans l'Europe de la Renaissance. Actes des premières Rencontres d'architecture européenne, Château de Maisons, 10-13 juin 2003. Picard, Paris, 2006, (De Architectura 11).
 Claude d'Anthenaise (ed.): Chasses princières dans l'Europe de la Renaissance. Actes du colloque de Chambord (1er et 2 octobre 2004). Fondation de la Maison de la Chasse et de la Nature. Actes Sud, Arles, 2007, .
 Heiko Laß: Jagd- und Lustschlösser: Art and culture of two sovereign construction tasks; shown in Thuringian constructions of the 17th and 18th century. Imhof, Petersberg, 2006,

External links

Castles by type
 Jagdschloss